Ana Veselinović (born 22 February 1988) is a former professional tennis player from Montenegro.

She has won six singles titles and 31 doubles titles on the ITF Circuit. On 10 September 2007, she reached her best singles ranking of world No. 329. On 6 August 2018, she peaked at No. 172 in the WTA doubles rankings.

Veselinović, although born in Herceg Novi, represented Serbia at ITF events until April 2013, but then started playing under the Montenegrin flag after making her debut for the Montenegro Fed Cup team.

ITF Circuit finals

Singles: 15 (6 titles, 9 runner-ups)

Doubles: 42 (31 titles, 11 runner-ups)

References

External links
 
 
 

1988 births
Living people
People from Herceg Novi
Montenegrin female tennis players
Serbian female tennis players
Serbia and Montenegro female tennis players
Auburn Montgomery Warhawks women's tennis players